It's Not That Simple is a 2016 Indian comedy-drama web series starring Akshay Oberoi, Vivan Bhatena, Karan Veer Mehra, Swara Bhaskar, Sumeet Vyas, Purab Kohli, Manasi Rachh, Neha Chauhan, Rohan Shah and Devika Vatsa in the lead roles. It was written by Charudutt Acharya and directed by Danish Aslam. It originally premiered on Voot on 21 October 2016.  Swara marked her web series debut with this and received praises for her performance.

Cast

Main 

 Akshay Oberoi
 Vivan Bhatena
 Karan Veer Mehra
 Swara Bhaskar
 Sumeet Vyas
 Purab Kohli
 Manasi Rachh
 Neha Chauhan
 Rohan Shah
 Devika Vatsa

Episodes

Season 1

Season 2

Release 
The series was announced to consist of 7 episodes as part of the first season on 6 October, 2016 and started airing on Voot on 21 October, 2016. It was written by Charudutt Acharya. The second season was announced by Voot on 30 August 2018 along with 16 other new original series.

Reception

Season 2 reviews 
The series received mixed responses from critics. It was praised for its performances by Swara Bhaskar and Sumeet Vyas while it was criticised by some for its story.

Sreehari Nair of Rediff.com gave 2 stars, criticizing its plot while praising the performance of the cast "What holds the show together is the cast; performers who frequently rise above their stodgy lines to bring something personal to the table." She added "It's Not That Simple is, at its core, a speeded-up, foul-mouthed version of shows like Shanti and Swabhimaan -- those Doordarshan soaps where business magnates had secrets that only their slavish butlers knew about."

Soumya Rao of Scroll.in mentioned "Strong performances come to the rescue when the dialogue and plot fall flat. The surface-scratching observations about gender bias and stereotypes are complemented by a couple of genuinely strong moments."

A reviewer for Firstpost said "Performance wise, It's Not That Simple season 2 earns brownie points. Vivan oscillates perfectly between the obsessive friend and repulsed, homophobic lover. Sumeet is unsurprisingly on point. His predatory nature is well-fleshed out, all the while keeping it understated. Swara Bhasker does justice to a role tailor-made for her"

The Indian Express gave 3 stars, saying "the focus here is on Swara who looks svelte and gives her character a heft and heave that never seem manufactured. Some of the dialogues do sound like bumper sticker wisdom and WhatsApp forwards."

References

External links 

 

Indian comedy web series
Comedy-drama web series